Linda Le (born December 15, 1982) is an American cosplayer, costumer, model, artist and Internet personality of Vietnamese descent. She is also known as Vampy Bit Me, or just Vampy or Vamp; "Vampy" is also a name she has given to her own fictional character persona.

Biography

Early life
Born in Okmulgee, Oklahoma to a family of Vietnamese immigrants, Le moved to and grew up in San Jose, California, where she graduated with business degree from San Jose State University while doing various odd jobs. She later studied hairstyling from Paul Mitchell's the U.S. and at Toni & Guy in London as well as in Tokyo, before returning to America where she began teaching makeup and modeling. She has been dressing up as classic anime and video game characters since she was 12.

Cosplaying

Her early fame came after some of her cosplays were featured in the showcase book Otacool 2 by Japanese toy and collectible company Kotobukiya. Le then collaborated with Street Fighter artist Long Vo to create artwork and a comic for Udon Entertainment's book VENT, as well as with Sideshow Collectibles' sculptor Tim Miller, theCHIVE, Gibson Guitar Corporation, KusoVinyl, Myx TV, Manga Entertainment UK and Bang Zoom! Entertainment, Jessica Chobot, and other artists and companies in the USA and Japan. Le is a part of costume and armor prop-making group Team Mantium Designs, later renamed Mantium Industries, and a video gamer sponsored by Mad Catz. Le has been writing a column for YouBentMyWookie and in 2012 she joined Nerdist Industries to produce Just Cos, an Internet show about the world of cosplay, co-hosted by Chloe Dykstra. Le was a member of Kat Gunn's professional gaming and cosplay team, Less Than 3 (LT3), which was also sponsored by Mad Catz. FHM Singapore featured her in the December 2013 issue, including on the cover.

She is a particular fan of Psylocke from X-Men, of whom she cosplayed in every version of the character, and of Morrigan Aensland from Darkstalkers. In 2013 interviews, Le said she works "almost 15 hour days and sleep about the maximum is around 4 hours", her favourite costume so far was the one of Teresa from Claymore, the most ambitious costume was Morrigan's, and the oddest costume request she has got was "the almost-naked Kasumi from Dead or Alive." She has been to over 200 American fan conventions between 2008 and 2013, when she has decided to "take some time off" later that year. Amped Asia in 2010 called her "probably the #1 most universally attractive Asian girl on the planet due to her geekiness (and sexiness too)." IGN in 2011 opined "her cosplay skill is off the charts." According to Kotaku in 2012, "Linda is a cosplay machine, renowned not just for the quality of her costumes, but their variety as well;" Kotaku has also previously described her as "incredibly attractive" and her works as "amazing". Asked in 2013 as where she sees herself in 20 years from now, Le answered: "Cosplay is great, but I can't be doing it forever ... Hopefully, I'll have my own costume line, come up with toys and do something related to the arts scene."

References

External links

VampyBitMe Twitch broadcast page

1985 births
American artists of Vietnamese descent
American costume designers
Women costume designers
Female models from Oklahoma
American models of Vietnamese descent
Cosplayers
Living people
People from Okmulgee, Oklahoma
San Jose State University alumni
21st-century American women